"Dance Band on the Titanic" is a song written and performed by Harry Chapin. The song was included on the album of the same name in 1977. Released as a single, the song became a hit on the Australian Charts. It has been included on numerous posthumous compilation albums.

Background
When describing the song, Chapin says that the entertainment industry acts like the Titanic's actual band; creating diversions so no one focuses on the iceberg.

Record World said that the song "incorporates bits of music hall, jazz and boogie-woogie, all underlying a bizarre tale of a famous sinking, icebergs and all."

Chart performance

Other uses
It was included on the Lies and Legends cast recording in 1984.

References

1977 songs
Harry Chapin songs
Songs written by Harry Chapin
Songs about the RMS Titanic